Ilias Botaitis (born 29 September 1979) is a Greek former professional footballer who played as a midfielder.

Career
Born in Greece, Botaitis began playing professional football with the Pierikos F.C. in the Gamma Ethniki. During his career, he appeared in 36 Alpha Ethniki, 110 Beta Ethniki and 67 Gamma Ethniki matches with Pierikos, Ethnikos Asteras , Panelefsiniakos F.C., Paniliakos , Panserraikos F.C., Panthrakikos F.C., Proodeftiki F.C. and Ag. Dimitrios F.C., before retiring from professional football in February 2012.

References

External links
Myplayer Profile
Profile at EPAE.org
Profile at Onsports.gr
Profile at Guardian Football

1979 births
Living people
Greek footballers
Pierikos F.C. players
Ethnikos Asteras F.C. players
Paniliakos F.C. players
Panserraikos F.C. players
Panthrakikos F.C. players
Proodeftiki F.C. players
Association football midfielders
Panelefsiniakos F.C. players